Amor y sexo (Safo '63) ("Love and Sex (Sappho '63)") is a 1964 Mexican film. It was directed by Luis Alcoriza and starred María Félix and Julio Alemán. It was premiered in Mexico on 5 May 1964. The movie is based on the French writer Alphonse Daudet's novel Safo.

Plot
Diana (María Félix) is a mature woman with a life full of romantic adventures, living a life of prostitution and drugs in Mexico's high society. Diana falls in love with Raul (Julio Alemán), a man 10 years younger than her. Diana harbours a big secret in the form of a former lover, whom she visits in prison every week. Soon, Diana's life and her past become a torment for Raúl.

Cast
 María Félix - Diana
 Julio Alemán - Raúl Solana
 Julio Aldama - Mauricio
 Augusto Benedico - Carlos
 José Gálvez - Licenciado Miguel Gaudal
 Laura Garcés - Laura
 Fernando Luján - "Gallina"
 Rogelio Guerra - Interno

External links
 

1964 films
Mexican drama films
1960s Spanish-language films
Films based on works by Alphonse Daudet
Films directed by Luis Alcoriza
1960s Mexican films